Nadziejewo  is a village in the administrative district of Gmina Środa Wielkopolska, within Środa Wielkopolska County, Greater Poland Voivodeship, in west-central Poland.

References

Nadziejewo